Dave Watson (c. 1946–1998) was a Scottish playwright, actor and director.

He is mainly known as the author of The Last Munro.
He also acted and directed for the Dumbarton People's Theatre (DPT) for a number of years.
He wrote some other material, including a play on Robert the Bruce, and took part in writing the DPT pantomime for several years.

He worked as an art teacher at Dumbarton Academy.

External links
information on The Last Munro

20th-century Scottish writers
1998 deaths
1940s births
People from Dumbarton